Martin Warnke (12 October 1937 – 11 December 2019) was a German art historian.

Life and work
Warnke grew up in a German pastor's family in Brazil. He studied art history, history and German literature at the universities of Munich, Madrid and Berlin. In 1963, he wrote a Ph.D. thesis on Peter Paul Rubens at the Free University of Berlin under Hans Kauffmann. In 1964 and 1965, he worked at the Berlin museums. In 1970, he completed his Habilitationsschrift on court art at the Westfälische Wilhelms-Universität Münster. From 1971 to 1978 he was a professor of art history at the University of Marburg. In 1979, he moved to the University of Hamburg, where he taught art history until his retirement in 2003.

Warnke represented a research direction that is particularly focused on the social history of art. He directed the Center for Political Iconography at the Warburg Haus, Hamburg. Here he devoted himself to the work of the important cultural theorist, Aby Warburg. 

Warnke was a member of the Deutsche Akademie für Sprache und Dichtung and the Committee on the Preservation of German Cultural Heritage. From 1983 to 1984, he was a member of the Institute for Advanced Study, Berlin. In 1987, he was a fellow at the Getty Research Institute in Santa Monica, California. From 1998 to 1999, he was a member of the Collegium Budapest - Institute for Advanced Study.

Warnke died on 11 December 2019 in Halle, Germany, at the age of 82.

Publications 
 Kommentare zu Rubens. Berlin 1965.
 Flämische Malerei des 17. Jahrhunderts in der Gemäldegalerie Berlin. Berlin 1967.
 Das Kunstwerk zwischen Wissenschaft und Weltanschauung. Gütersloh 1970.
 Bau und Überbau: Soziologie der mittelalterlichen Architektur nach den Schriftquellen. Frankfurt am Main 1976.
 Peter Paul Rubens: Leben und Werk. Cologne 1977.
 Cranachs Luther: Entwürfe für ein Image. Frankfurt am Main 1984.
 Politische Landschaft: Zur Kunstgeschichte der Natur. Munich 1992.
 Hofkünstler: Zur Vorgeschichte des modernen Künstlers. 2nd edition, Cologne 1996.
 Geschichte der deutschen Kunst in drei Bänden, Vol. 2: Spätmittelalter und Frühe Neuzeit 1400–1750. Munich 1999.
 Bildwirklichkeiten. Göttingen 2005.
 Velázquez: Form & Reform. Cologne 2005.
Peter Paul Rubens. Cologne 2006.
 Könige als Künstler. Münster 2007.
 (with Uwe Fleckner and Hendrik Ziegler), Handbuch der politischen Ikonographie. Vol. 1: Abdankung bis Huldigung. Vol. 2: Imperator bis Zwerg. 2nd edition. Munich 2011.
 Zeitgenossenschaft: Zum Auschwitz-Prozess 1964. Zurich 2014.

Awards
 1990: Gottfried Wilhelm Leibniz Prize of the Deutsche Forschungsgemeinschaft
 2006: Prize of the Gerda Henkel Stiftung
 2012: Aby Warburg Prize

References

External links
Dictionary of Art Historians: Warnke, Martin
Gerda Henkel Stiftung: Prof. Dr. Martin Warnke, Lebenslauf
Hubertus Kohle, "Martin Warnke (ed.): Politische Kunst: Gebärden und Gebaren, Berlin: Akademie Verlag 2004, Sehepunkte 5 (2005), No. 3

German art historians
1937 births
2019 deaths
Academic staff of the University of Marburg
Academic staff of the University of Hamburg
20th-century German historians
21st-century German historians
21st-century German male writers
20th-century German male writers
Free University of Berlin alumni
Complutense University of Madrid alumni
German expatriates in Hungary
Ludwig Maximilian University of Munich alumni
German expatriates in Brazil
People from Ijuí
German expatriates in Spain
German expatriates in the United States